The Poor Fellow-Soldiers of Christ and of the Temple of Solomon, also known as the Order of Solomon's Temple, the Knights Templar, or simply the Templars, was a Catholic military order, one of the wealthiest and most popular military orders in Western Christianity. They were founded in 1119, headquartered on the Temple Mount in Jerusalem, and existed for nearly two centuries during the Middle Ages.

Officially endorsed by the Roman Catholic Church by such decrees as the papal bull Omne datum optimum of Pope Innocent II, the Templars became a favored charity throughout Christendom and grew rapidly in membership and power. The Templar knights, in their distinctive white mantles with a red cross, were among the most skilled fighting units of the Crusades. They were prominent in Christian finance; non-combatant members of the order, who made up as much as 90% of their members, managed a large economic infrastructure throughout Christendom. They developed innovative financial techniques that were an early form of banking, building a network of nearly 1,000 commanderies and fortifications across Europe and the Holy Land, and arguably forming the world's first multinational corporation. 

The Templars were closely tied to the Crusades; as they became unable to secure their holdings in the Holy Land, support for the order faded. Rumours about the Templars' secret initiation ceremony created distrust, and King Philip IV of France, while being deeply in debt to the order, used this distrust to take advantage of the situation. In 1307, he pressured Pope Clement to have many of the order's members in France arrested, tortured into giving false confessions, and then burned at the stake. Under further pressure, Pope Clement V disbanded the order in 1312. The abrupt disappearance of a major part of the medieval European infrastructure gave rise to speculation and legends, which have kept the "Templar" name alive into the present day.

History

Rise 
After the Franks in the First Crusade captured Jerusalem from the Fatimid Caliphate in 1099 A.D., many Christians made pilgrimages to various sacred sites in the Holy Land. Although the city of Jerusalem was relatively secure under Christian control, the rest of Outremer was not. Bandits and marauding highwaymen preyed upon these Christian pilgrims, who were routinely slaughtered, sometimes by the hundreds, as they attempted to make the journey from the coastline at Jaffa through to the interior of the Holy Land.

In 1119, the French knight Hugues de Payens approached King Baldwin II of Jerusalem and Warmund, Patriarch of Jerusalem, and proposed creating a Catholic monastic religious order for the protection of these pilgrims. King Baldwin and Patriarch Warmund agreed to the request, probably at the Council of Nablus in January 1120, and the king granted the Templars a headquarters in a wing of the royal palace on the Temple Mount in the captured Al-Aqsa Mosque.  

The Temple Mount had a mystique because it was above what was believed to be the ruins of the Temple of Solomon. The Crusaders therefore referred to the Al-Aqsa Mosque as Solomon's Temple, and from this location the new order took the name of Poor Knights of Christ and the Temple of Solomon, or "Templar" knights. The order, with about nine knights including Godfrey de Saint-Omer and André de Montbard, had few financial resources and relied on donations to survive. Their emblem was of two knights riding on a single horse, emphasizing the order's poverty.

The impoverished status of the Templars did not last long. They had a powerful advocate in Saint Bernard of Clairvaux, a leading Church figure, the French abbot primarily responsible for the founding of the Cistercian Order of monks and a nephew of André de Montbard, one of the founding knights. Bernard put his weight behind them and wrote persuasively on their behalf in the letter "In Praise of the New Knighthood", and in 1129, at the Council of Troyes, he led a group of leading churchmen to officially approve and endorse the order on behalf of the church. With this formal blessing, the Templars became a favoured charity throughout Christendom, receiving money, land, businesses, and noble-born sons from families who were eager to help with the fight in the Holy Land. At the Council of Pisa in 1135, Pope Innocent II initiated the first papal monetary donation to the Order. Another major benefit came in 1139, when Innocent II's papal bull  exempted the order from obedience to local laws. This ruling meant that the Templars could pass freely through all borders, were not required to pay any taxes, and were exempt from all authority except that of the pope.

With its clear mission and ample resources, the order grew rapidly. Templars were often the advance shock troops in key battles of the Crusades, as the heavily armoured knights on their warhorses would set out to charge at the enemy, ahead of the main army bodies, in an attempt to break opposition lines. One of their most famous victories was in 1177 during the Battle of Montgisard, where some 500 Templar knights helped several thousand infantry to defeat Saladin's army of more than 26,000 soldiers.

Although the primary mission of the order was militaristic, relatively few members were combatants. The others acted in support positions to assist the knights and to manage the financial infrastructure. The Templar Order, though its members were sworn to individual poverty, was given control of wealth beyond direct donations. A nobleman who was interested in participating in the Crusades might place all his assets under Templar management while he was away. Accumulating wealth in this manner throughout Christendom and the Outremer, the order in 1150 began generating letters of credit for pilgrims journeying to the Holy Land: pilgrims deposited their valuables with a local Templar preceptory before embarking, received a document indicating the value of their deposit, then used that document upon arrival in the Holy Land to retrieve their funds in an amount of treasure of equal value. This innovative arrangement was an early form of banking and may have been the first formal system to support the use of cheques; it improved the safety of pilgrims by making them less attractive targets for thieves, and also contributed to the Templar coffers.

Based on this mix of donations and business dealing, the Templars established financial networks across the whole of Christendom. They acquired large tracts of land, both in Europe and the Middle East; they bought and managed farms and vineyards; they built massive stone cathedrals and castles; they were involved in manufacturing, import and export; they had their own fleet of ships; and at one point they even owned the entire island of Cyprus. The Order of the Knights Templar arguably qualifies as the world's first multinational corporation.

Decline 

In the mid-12th century, the tide began to turn in the Crusades. The Islamic world had become more united under effective leaders such as Saladin. Dissension arose among Christian factions in and concerning the Holy Land. The Knights Templar were occasionally at odds with the two other Christian military orders, the Knights Hospitaller and the Teutonic Knights, and decades of internecine feuds weakened Christian positions, both politically and militarily. After the Templars were involved in several unsuccessful campaigns, including the pivotal Battle of Hattin, Jerusalem was recaptured by Muslim forces under Saladin in 1187. The Holy Roman Emperor Frederick II reclaimed the city for Christians in the Sixth Crusade of 1229, without Templar aid, but only held it for a little more than a decade. In 1244, the Ayyubid dynasty together with Khwarezmi mercenaries recaptured Jerusalem, and the city did not return to Western control until 1917 when, during World War I, the British captured it from the Ottoman Empire.

The Templars were forced to relocate their headquarters to other cities in the north, such as the seaport of Acre, which they held for the next century. It was lost in 1291, followed by their last mainland strongholds, Tortosa (Tartus in present-day Syria) and Atlit (in present-day Israel). Their headquarters then moved to Limassol on the island of Cyprus, and they also attempted to maintain a garrison on tiny Arwad Island, just off the coast from Tortosa. In 1300, there was some attempt to engage in coordinated military efforts with the Mongols via a new invasion force at Arwad. In 1302 or 1303, however, the Templars lost the island to the Egyptian Mamluk Sultanate in the siege of Arwad. With the island gone, the Crusaders lost their last foothold in the Holy Land.

With the order's military mission now less important, support for the organization began to dwindle. The situation was complex, however, since during the two hundred years of their existence, the Templars had become a part of daily life throughout Christendom. The organisation's Templar Houses, hundreds of which were dotted throughout Europe and the Near East, gave them a widespread presence at the local level. The Templars still managed many businesses, and many Europeans had daily contact with the Templar network, such as by working at a Templar farm or vineyard, or using the order as a bank in which to store personal valuables. The order was still not subject to local government, making it everywhere a "state within a state" – its standing army, although it no longer had a well-defined mission, could pass freely through all borders. This situation heightened tensions with some European nobility, especially as the Templars were indicating an interest in founding their own monastic state, just as the Teutonic Knights had done in Prussia and the Baltic and the Knights Hospitaller were doing in Rhodes.

Arrests, charges and dissolution 

In 1305, the new Pope Clement V, based in Avignon, France, sent letters to both the Templar Grand Master Jacques de Molay and the Hospitaller Grand Master Fulk de Villaret to discuss the possibility of merging the two orders. Neither was amenable to the idea, but Pope Clement persisted, and in 1306 he invited both Grand Masters to France to discuss the matter. De Molay arrived first in early 1307, but de Villaret was delayed for several months. While waiting, De Molay and Clement discussed criminal charges that had been made two years earlier by an ousted Templar and were being discussed by King Philip IV of France and his ministers. It was generally agreed that the charges were false, but Clement sent the king a written request for assistance in the investigation. According to some historians, King Philip, who was already deeply in debt to the Templars from his war against England, decided to seize upon the rumours for his own purposes. He began pressuring the church to take action against the order, as a way of freeing himself from his debts. 

At dawn on Friday, 13 October 1307—a date sometimes incorrectly cited as the origin of the popular stories about Friday the 13th—King Philip IV ordered de Molay and scores of other French Templars to be simultaneously arrested. The arrest warrant started with the words:  ("God is not pleased. We have enemies of the faith in the kingdom"). 

Claims were made that during Templar admissions ceremonies, recruits were forced to spit on the Cross, deny Christ, and engage in indecent kissing; brethren were also accused of worshipping idols, and the order was said to have encouraged homosexual practices. Many of these allegations contain tropes that bear similarities to accusations made against other persecuted groups such as Jews, heretics, and accused witches. These allegations, though, were highly politicised without any real evidence. Still, the Templars were charged with numerous other offences such as financial corruption, fraud, and secrecy. Many of the accused confessed to these charges under torture (even though the Templars denied being tortured in their written confessions), and their confessions, even though obtained under duress, caused a scandal in Paris. The prisoners were coerced to confess that they had spat on the Cross. One said:  ("I, Raymond de La Fère, 21 years old, admit that I have spat three times on the Cross, but only from my mouth and not from my heart"). The Templars were accused of idolatry and were suspected of worshiping either a figure known as Baphomet or a mummified severed head they recovered, amongst other artifacts, at their original headquarters on the Temple Mount that many scholars theorize might have been that of John the Baptist, among other things.

Relenting to Phillip's demands, Pope Clement then issued the papal bull  on 22 November 1307, which instructed all Christian monarchs in Europe to arrest all Templars and seize their assets. Pope Clement called for papal hearings to determine the Templars' guilt or innocence, and once freed of the Inquisitors' torture, many Templars recanted their confessions. Some had sufficient legal experience to defend themselves in the trials, but in 1310, having appointed the archbishop of Sens, Philippe de Marigny, to lead the investigation, Philip blocked this attempt, using the previously forced confessions to have dozens of Templars burned at the stake in Paris.

With Philip threatening military action unless the pope complied with his wishes, Pope Clement finally agreed to disband the order, citing the public scandal that had been generated by the confessions.

As for the leaders of the order, the elderly Grand Master Jacques de Molay, who had confessed under torture, retracted his confession. Geoffroi de Charney, Preceptor of Normandy, also retracted his confession and insisted on his innocence. Both men were declared guilty of being relapsed heretics and sentenced to burn alive at the stake in Paris on 18 March 1314. De Molay reportedly remained defiant to the end, asking to be tied in such a way that he could face the Notre Dame Cathedral and hold his hands together in prayer. According to legend, he called out from the flames that both Pope Clement and King Philip would soon meet him before God. His actual words were recorded on the parchment as follows:  ("God knows who is wrong and has sinned. Soon a calamity will occur to those who have condemned us to death"). Pope Clement died only a month later, and King Philip died while hunting within the same year.

The remaining Templars around Europe were either arrested and tried under the Papal investigation (with virtually none convicted), absorbed into other Catholic military orders, or pensioned off and allowed to live out their days peacefully. By papal decree, the property of the Templars was transferred to the Knights Hospitaller except in the Kingdoms of Castile, Aragon, and Portugal. Portugal was the first country in Europe where they had settled, occurring only two or three years after the order's foundation in Jerusalem and even having presence during Portugal's conception.

The Portuguese king, Denis I, refused to pursue and persecute the former knights, as had occurred in all other sovereign states under the influence of the Catholic Church. Under his protection, Templar organizations simply changed their name, from "Knights Templar" to the reconstituted Order of Christ and also a parallel Supreme Order of Christ of the Holy See; both are considered successors to the Knights Templar.

Chinon Parchment 

In September 2001, a document known as the Chinon Parchment dated 17–20 August 1308 was discovered in the Vatican Secret Archives by Barbara Frale, apparently after having been filed in the wrong place in 1628. It is a record of the trial of the Templars and shows that Clement absolved the Templars of all heresies in 1308 before formally disbanding the order in 1312, as did another Chinon Parchment dated 20 August 1308 addressed to Philip IV of France, also mentioning that all Templars that had confessed to heresy were "restored to the Sacraments and to the unity of the Church". This other Chinon Parchment has been well known to historians, having been published by Étienne Baluze in 1693 and by Pierre Dupuy in 1751.

The current position of the Roman Catholic Church is that the medieval persecution of the Knights Templar was unjust, that nothing was inherently wrong with the order or its rule, and that Pope Clement was pressed into his actions by the magnitude of the public scandal and by the dominating influence of King Philip IV, who was Clement's relative.

Organization 

The Templars were organized as a monastic order similar to Bernard's Cistercian Order, which was considered the first effective international organization in Europe. The organizational structure had a strong chain of authority. Each country with a major Templar presence (France, Poitou, Anjou, Jerusalem, England, Spain, Portugal, Italy, Tripoli, Antioch, Hungary, and Croatia) had a Master of the Order for the Templars in that region.

All of them were subject to the Grand Master, appointed for life, who oversaw both the order's military efforts in the East and their financial holdings in the West. The Grand Master exercised his authority via the visitors-general of the order, who were knights specially appointed by the Grand Master and convent of Jerusalem to visit the different provinces, correct malpractices, introduce new regulations, and resolve important disputes. The visitors-general had the power to remove knights from office and to suspend the Master of the province concerned.

No precise numbers exist, but it is estimated that at the order's peak there were between 15,000 and 20,000 Templars, of whom about a tenth were actual knights.

Ranks within the order

Three main ranks 
There was a threefold division of the ranks of the Templars: the noble knights, the non-noble sergeants, and the chaplains. The Templars did not perform knighting ceremonies, so any knight wishing to become a Knight Templar had to be a knight already. They were the most visible branch of the order, and wore the famous white mantles to symbolize their purity and chastity. They were equipped as heavy cavalry, with three or four horses and one or two squires. Squires were generally not members of the order but were instead outsiders who were hired for a set period of time. Beneath the knights in the order and drawn from non-noble families were the sergeants. They brought vital skills and trades from blacksmiths and builders, including administration of many of the order's European properties. In the Crusader States, they fought alongside the knights as light cavalry with a single horse. Several of the order's most senior positions were reserved for sergeants, including the post of Commander of the Vault of Acre, who was the de facto Admiral of the Templar fleet.  The sergeants wore black or brown. From 1139, chaplains constituted a third Templar class. They were ordained priests who cared for the Templars' spiritual needs. All three classes of brother wore the order's red cross.

Grand Masters 

Starting with founder Hugues de Payens in 1118–1119, the order's highest office was that of Grand Master, a position which was held for life, though considering the martial nature of the order, this could mean a very short tenure. All but two of the Grand Masters died in office, and several died during military campaigns. For example, during the Siege of Ascalon in 1153, Grand Master Bernard de Tremelay led a group of 40 Templars through a breach in the city walls. When the rest of the Crusader army did not follow, the Templars, including their Grand Master, were surrounded and beheaded. Grand Master Gérard de Ridefort was beheaded by Saladin in 1189 at the Siege of Acre.

The Grand Master oversaw all of the operations of the order, including both the military operations in the Holy Land and Eastern Europe and the Templars' financial and business dealings in Western Europe. Some Grand Masters also served as battlefield commanders, though this was not always wise: several blunders in de Ridefort's combat leadership contributed to the devastating defeat at the Battle of Hattin. The last Grand Master was Jacques de Molay, burned at the stake in Paris in 1314 by order of King Philip IV.

Conduct, costume and beards 

Bernard de Clairvaux and founder Hugues de Payens devised a specific code of conduct for the Templar Order, known to modern historians as the Latin Rule. Its 72 clauses laid down the details of the knights' way of life, including the types of garments they were to wear and how many horses they could have. Knights were to take their meals in silence, eat meat no more than three times per week, and not have physical contact of any kind with women, even members of their own family. A Master of the Order was assigned "4 horses, and one chaplain-brother and one clerk with three horses, and one sergeant brother with two horses, and one gentleman valet to carry his shield and lance, with one horse". As the order grew, more guidelines were added, and the original list of 72 clauses was expanded to several hundred in its final form.

The knights wore a white surcoat with a red cross, and a white mantle also with a red cross; the sergeants wore a black tunic with a red cross on the front and a black or brown mantle. The white mantle was assigned to the Templars at the Council of Troyes in 1129, and the cross was most probably added to their robes at the launch of the Second Crusade in 1147, when Pope Eugenius III, King Louis VII of France, and many other notables attended a meeting of the French Templars at their headquarters near Paris. Under the Rule, the knights were to wear the white mantle at all times: they were even forbidden to eat or drink unless wearing it.

The red cross that the Templars wore on their robes was a symbol of martyrdom, and to die in combat was considered a great honour that assured a place in heaven. There was a cardinal rule that the warriors of the order should never surrender unless the Templar flag had fallen, and even then they were first to try to regroup with another of the Christian orders, such as that of the Hospitallers. Only after all flags had fallen were they allowed to leave the battlefield. This uncompromising principle, along with their reputation for courage, excellent training, and heavy armament, made the Templars one of the most feared combat forces in medieval times.

Although not prescribed by the Templar Rule, it later became customary for members of the order to wear long and prominent beards. In about 1240, Alberic of Trois-Fontaines described the Templars as an "order of bearded brethren"; while during the interrogations by the papal commissioners in Paris in 1310–1311, out of nearly 230 knights and brothers questioned, 76 are described as wearing a beard, in some cases specified as being "in the style of the Templars", and 133 are said to have shaved off their beards, either in renunciation of the order or because they had hoped to escape detection.

Initiation, known as Reception (receptio) into the order, was a profound commitment and involved a solemn ceremony. Outsiders were discouraged from attending the ceremony, which aroused the suspicions of medieval inquisitors during the later trials. New members had to willingly sign over all of their wealth and goods to the order and take vows of poverty, chastity, piety, and obedience. Most brothers joined for life, although some were allowed to join for a set period. Sometimes a married man was allowed to join if he had his wife's permission, but he was not allowed to wear the white mantle.

Legacy 

With their military mission and extensive financial resources, the Knights Templar funded a large number of building projects around Europe and the Holy Land. Many of these structures are still standing.  Many sites also maintain the name "Temple" because of centuries-old association with the Templars. For example, some of the Templars' lands in London were later rented to lawyers, which led to the names of the Temple Bar gateway and the Temple Underground station. Two of the four Inns of Court which may call members to act as barristers are the Inner Temple and Middle Temple – the entire area known as Temple, London.

Distinctive architectural elements of Templar buildings include the use of the image of "two knights on a single horse", representing the Knights' poverty, and round buildings designed to resemble the Church of the Holy Sepulchre in Jerusalem.

Modern organizations 
The Knights Templar were dismantled in the Rolls of the Catholic Church in 1309. Following the suppression of the Order, a number of Knights Templar joined the newly established Order of Christ, which effectively reabsorbed the Knights Templar and its properties in AD 1319, especially in Portugal. The story of the persecution and sudden dissolution of the secretive yet powerful medieval Templars has drawn many other groups to use alleged connections with them as a way of enhancing their own image and mystery. Apart from the Order of Christ, there is no clear historical connection between the Knights Templar and any other modern organization, the earliest of which emerged publicly in the 18th century. Associations such as the Order of Christ and Templari Cattolici d'Italia are the only two known organizations that are in alignment with the Catholic Church. 

Following the dissolution of the Knights Templar, the Order of Christ was erected in 1319 and absorbed many of the Knights Templar into its ranks, along with Knights Templar properties in Portugal. Its headquarters became a castle in Tomar, a former Knights Templar castle. 

The Military Order of Christ consider themselves the successors of the former Knights Templar. After the Templars were abolished on 22 March 1312, the Order of Christ was founded in 1319 under the protection of the Portuguese king Denis, who refused to persecute the former knights as in most other states under the influence of the Catholic Church. Denis revived the Templars of Tomar as the Order of Christ, grateful for their aid during the Reconquista and in the reconstruction of Portugal after the wars. Denis negotiated with Clement's successor John XXII for recognition of the new order and its right to inherit Templar assets and property. This was granted in the papal bull Ad ea ex quibus of 14 March 1319.

Temperance movement 

Many temperance organizations named themselves after the Poor Fellow-Soldiers of Christ and of the Temple of Solomon, citing the belief that the original Knights Templar "drank sour milk, and also because they were fighting 'a great crusade' against 'this terrible vice' of alcohol". The largest of these, the International Order of Good Templars (IOGT), grew throughout the world after being started in the 19th century and continues to advocate for the abstinence from alcohol and other drugs; other Orders in this tradition include those of the Templars of Honor and Temperance (Tempel Riddare Orden), which has a large presence in Scandinavia.

Self-styled orders 
The Sovereign Military Order of the Temple of Jerusalem (French: Ordre Souverain et Militaire du Temple de Jérusalem, OSMTJ; Latin: Ordo Supremus Militaris Templi Hierosolymitani, OSMTH) is a self-styled order which was publicly disclosed in 1804 and "accredited as a nongovernmental organization (NGO) by the UN in 2001". It is ecumenical in that it admits Christians of many denominations in its ranks. Bernard-Raymond Fabré-Palaprat produced the Larmenius Charter in 1804 with a claim of succession to the original Catholic Christian military order.

Freemasonry 

Freemasonry has incorporated the symbols and rituals of several medieval military orders in a number of Masonic bodies since at least the 18th century. This can be seen in the "Red Cross of Constantine," inspired by the Military Constantinian Order; the "Order of Malta," inspired by the Knights Hospitaller; and the "Order of the Temple", inspired by the Knights Templar. The Orders of Malta and the Temple feature prominently in the York Rite. One theory on the origin of Freemasonry claims direct descent from the historical Knights Templar through its final fourteenth-century members who were thought to have taken refuge in Scotland and aided Robert the Bruce in his victory at Bannockburn. This theory is usually rejected both by Masonic authorities and historians due to lack of evidence in regards to the connections.

Modern popular culture 

The Knights Templar have been associated with legends circulated even during their time. Masonic writers added their own speculations in the 18th century, and further fictional embellishments have been added in popular novels such as Ivanhoe, Foucault's Pendulum, and The Da Vinci Code; modern movies such as National Treasure, The Last Templar, Indiana Jones and the Last Crusade; the television series Knightfall; as well as video games such as Broken Sword, Deus Ex, Assassin's Creed and Dante's Inferno.

There have been speculative popular publications surrounding the order's early occupation of the Temple Mount in Jerusalem as well as speculation about what relics the Templars may have found there.
The association of the Holy Grail with the Templars has precedents even in 12th-century fiction; Wolfram von Eschenbach's Parzival calls the knights guarding the Grail Kingdom templeisen, apparently a conscious fictionalisation of the templarii.

See also 
 Sovereign Military Order of Malta – Descended from the Knights Hospitaller, another Catholic religious order involved in the Crusades
 Teutonic Order – Another Catholic religious order involved in the Crusades
 Militia Templi – A still-existent Catholic religious order with the same spirituality as the Knights Templar

Notes

References

Citations

Sources 

 Isle of Avalon, Lundy. "The Rule of the Knights Templar A Powerful Champion" The Knights Templar. Mystic Realms, 2010. Web
 
 
 
 
 
 
 Mario Dal Bello (2013). Gli Ultimi Giorni dei Templari, Città Nuova, 
 
 
 
 
 
 
 
 
 

 
 
 
 Selwood, Dominic (2013). ” The Knights Templar 1: The Knights”
 Selwood, Dominic (2013).  ”The Knights Templar 2: Sergeants, Women, Chaplains, Affiliates”
 Selwood, Dominic (2013).  ”The Knights Templar 3: Birth of the Order”
 Selwood, Dominic  (2013).  ”The Knights Templar 4: Saint Bernard of Clairvaux”

Further reading 
 Addison, Charles (1842). The History of the Knights Templar
 d'Albon, André. Cartulaire général de l'ordre du Temple: 1119?–1150 (1913–1922) (at Gallica)
 Malcolm Barber, Keith Bate (2002). The Templars: Selected Sources Translated and Annotated by Malcolm Barber and Keith Bate. Manchester University Press 
 
 Jochen Burgtorf, Shlomo Lotan, Enric Mallorquí-Ruscalleda (eds.) (2021). The Templars: The Rise, Fall, and Legacy of a Military Religious Order, Routledge 
 
 
 
 Clausen, Daniel (2021). Templar Succession: Establishing Continuity 1307-Present. Codex Spiritualis Press. ISBN 979-8465277525
 
 
 
 Levaye, Patrick (2007). Géopolitique du Catholicisme. Éditions Ellipses

External links 

 Knights Templar - World History Encyclopedia
 

 
1119 establishments in Asia
1312 disestablishments in Asia
1119 establishments in Europe
1312 disestablishments in Europe
Religious organizations established in the 1110s
Organizations disestablished in the 14th century
Philip IV of France
12th-century Christianity